Sarvepalli Radhakrishnan  (5 September 1888 – 17 April 1975), natively Radhakrishnayya, was an Indian philosopher and statesman. He served as the second president of India from 1962 to 1967. He was also the first vice president of India from 1952 to 1962. He was the second ambassador of India to the Soviet Union from 1949 to 1952. He was also the fourth vice-chancellor of Banaras Hindu University from 1939 to 1948 and the second vice-chancellor of Andhra University from 1931 to 1936.  

One of the most distinguished twentieth-century scholars of comparative religion and philosophy, Radhakrishnan held the King George V Chair of Mental and Moral Science at the University of Calcutta from 1921 to 1932 and Spalding Chair of Eastern Religion and Ethics at University of Oxford from 1936 to 1952.

Radhakrishnan's philosophy was grounded in Advaita Vedanta, reinterpreting this tradition for a contemporary understanding. He defended Hinduism against what he called "uninformed Western criticism", contributing to the formation of contemporary Hindu identity. He has been influential in shaping the understanding of Hinduism, in both India and the west, and earned a reputation as a bridge-builder between India and the West.

Radhakrishnan was awarded several high awards during his life, including a knighthood in 1931, the Bharat Ratna, the highest civilian award in India, in 1954, and honorary membership of the British Royal Order of Merit in 1963. He was also one of the founders of Helpage India, a non profit organisation for elderly underprivileged in India. Radhakrishnan believed that "teachers should be the best minds in the country". Since 1962, his birthday has been celebrated in India as Teachers' Day on 5 September every year.

Biography

Early life
Radhakrishnan was born as Sarvepalli Radhakrishnayya into a Telugu-speaking family of Sarvepalli Veeraswami and Sithamma in Tiruttani of North Arcot district in the erstwhile Madras Presidency now in Tiruvallur district of Tamil Nadu. His family hails from Sarvepalli village in Nellore district of Andhra Pradesh. His early years were spent in Thiruttani and Tirupati. His father was a subordinate revenue official in the service of a local zamindar (local landlord). His primary education was at K. V. High School at Thiruttani. In 1896 he moved to the Hermansburg Evangelical Lutheran Mission School in Tirupati and Government High Secondary School, Walajapet.

Education
 Radhakrishnan was awarded scholarships throughout his academic life. He joined Voorhees College in Vellore for his high school education. After his F.A. (First of Arts) class, he joined the Madras Christian College (affiliated to the University of Madras) at the age of 16. He graduated from there in 1907, and also finished his Masters from the same college.

Radhakrishnan studied philosophy by chance rather than choice. Being a financially constrained student, when a cousin who graduated from the same college passed on his philosophy textbooks to Radhakrishnan, it automatically decided his academics course.

Sarvepalli wrote his bachelor's degree thesis on "The Ethics of the Vedanta and its Metaphysical Presuppositions". It "was intended to be a reply to the charge that the Vedanta system had no room for ethics." Two of his professors, Rev. William Meston and Dr. Alfred George Hogg, commended Radhakrishnan's dissertation. Radhakrishnan's thesis was published when he was only twenty. According to Radhakrishnan himself, the criticism of Hogg and other Christian teachers of Indian culture "disturbed my faith and shook the traditional props on which I leaned." Radhakrishnan himself describes how, as a student,

This led him to his critical study of Indian philosophy and religion and a lifelong defence of Hinduism against "uninformed Western criticism". At the same time, Radhakrishnan commended Professor Hogg as 'My distinguished teacher,' and as "one of the greatest Christian thinkers we had in India.' Besides, Professor William Skinner, who was acting Principal of the College, gave a testimonial saying "he is one of the best men we have had in the recent years", which enabled him to get the first job in Presidency College. In reciprocation, Radhakrishnan dedicated one of his early books to William Skinner.

The Spirit of Abheda

Radhakrishnan expresses his anguish, against the British critics, in The Ethics of the Vedanta. Here he wrote, "it has become philosophic fashion of the present day to consider the Vedanta system a non-ethical one." He quotes a German-born philologist and Orientalist, who lived and studied in Britain for most of his life, Max Muller as stating, "The Vedanta philosophy has not neglected the important sphere of ethics; but on the contrary, we find ethics in the beginning, ethics in the middle, and ethics in the end, to say nothing of the fact that minds, so engrossed with divine things as Vedanta philosophers, are not likely to fall victims to the ordinary temptations of the world, the flesh, and other powers."

Radhakrishnan then explains how this philosophy requires us (people) to look upon all creations as one. As non-different. This is where he introduces "The Spirit of Abheda". He quotes, "In morals, the individual is enjoined to cultivate a Spirit of Abheda, or non-difference." Thus he mentions how this "naturally leads to the ethics of love and brotherhood".

"Every other individual is to be regarded as your co-equal, and treated as an end, not a means."

"The Vedanta requires us to respect human dignity and demands the recognition of man as man."

Marriage and family 
Radhakrishnan was married to Sivakamu, a distant cousin, at the age of 16.  As per tradition the marriage was arranged by the family. The couple had five daughters named Padmavati, Rukmini, Sushila, Sundari and Shakuntala. They also had a son named Sarvepalli Gopal who went on to a notable career as a historian. Many of Radhakrishnan's family members including his grandchildren and great-grandchildren have pursued a wide range of careers in academia, public policy, medicine, law, banking, business, publishing and other fields across the world. Sivakamu died on 26 November 1956. They were married for about 53 years.

Academic career

In April 1909, Radhakrishnan was appointed to the Department of Philosophy at the Madras Presidency College. Thereafter, in 1918, he was selected as Professor of Philosophy by the University of Mysore, where he taught at its Maharaja's College, Mysore.  By that time he had written many articles for journals of repute like The Quest, Journal of Philosophy and the International Journal of Ethics. He also completed his first book, The Philosophy of Rabindranath Tagore. He believed Tagore's philosophy to be the "genuine manifestation of the Indian spirit". His second book, The Reign of Religion in Contemporary Philosophy was published in 1920.

In 1921 he was appointed as a professor in philosophy to occupy the King George V Chair of Mental and Moral Science at the University of Calcutta. He represented the University of Calcutta at the Congress of the Universities of the British Empire in June 1926 and the International Congress of Philosophy at Harvard University in September 1926. Another important academic event during this period was the invitation to deliver the Hibbert Lecture on the ideals of life which he delivered at Manchester College, Oxford in 1929 and which was subsequently published in book form as An Idealist View of Life.

In 1929 Radhakrishnan was invited to take the post vacated by Principal J. Estlin Carpenter at Manchester College. This gave him the opportunity to lecture to the students of the University of Oxford on Comparative Religion. For his services to education he was knighted by George V in the June 1931 Birthday Honours, and formally invested with his honour by the Governor-General of India, the Earl of Willingdon, in April 1932. However, he ceased to use the title after Indian independence, preferring instead his academic title of 'Doctor'.

He was the vice-chancellor of Andhra University from 1931 to 1936. During his first convocation address, he spoke about his native Andhra as, 

In 1936 Radhakrishnan was named Spalding Professor of Eastern Religion and Ethics at the University of Oxford, and was elected a Fellow of All Souls College. That same year, and again in 1937, he was nominated for the Nobel Prize in Literature, although this nomination process, as for all laureates, was not public at the time. Further nominations for the award would continue steadily into the 1960s. In 1939 Pt. Madan Mohan Malaviya invited him to succeed him as the Vice-Chancellor of Banaras Hindu University (BHU). He served as its Vice-Chancellor till January 1948.

Political career

Radhakrishnan started his political career "rather late in life", after his successful academic career. His international authority preceded his political career. He was one of those stalwarts who attended Andhra Mahasabha in 1928 where he seconded the idea of renaming Ceded Districts division of Madras Presidency as Rayalaseema. In 1931 he was nominated to the League of Nations Committee for Intellectual Cooperation, where after "in Western eyes he was the recognized Hindu authority on Indian ideas and a persuasive interpreter of the role of Eastern institutions in contemporary society." 

When India became independent in 1947,  Radhakrishnan represented India at UNESCO (1946–52) and was later Ambassador of India to the Soviet Union, from 1949 to 1952. He was also elected to the Constituent Assembly of India. Radhakrishnan was elected as the first Vice-President of India in 1952, and elected as the second President of India (1962–1967). Radhakrishnan did not have a background in the Congress Party, nor was he active in the Indian independence movement. He was the politician in shadow. His motivation lay in his pride of Hindu culture, and the defence of Hinduism against "uninformed Western criticism". According to the historian Donald Mackenzie Brown,

Teacher's Day
When Radhakrishnan became the President of India, some of his students and friends requested him to allow them to celebrate his birthday, on 5 September. He replied,

Instead of celebrating my birthday, it would be my proud privilege if September 5th is observed as Teachers' Day.

His birthday has since been celebrated as Teacher's Day in India.

Charity
Along with G. D. Birla and some other social workers in the pre-independence era, Radhakrishnan formed the Krishnarpan Charity Trust.

Role in Constituent Assembly 
He was against State institutions imparting denominational religious instruction as it was against the secular vision of the Indian State.

Philosophy
Radhakrishnan tried to bridge eastern and western thought, defending Hinduism against "uninformed Western criticism", but also incorporating Western philosophical and religious thought.

Advaita Vedanta
Radhakrishnan was one of the most prominent spokesmen of Neo-Vedanta. His metaphysics was grounded in Advaita Vedanta, but he reinterpreted Advaita Vedanta for a contemporary understanding. He acknowledged the reality and diversity of the world of experience, which he saw as grounded in and supported by the absolute or Brahman. Radhakrishnan also reinterpreted Shankara's notion of maya. According to Radhakrishnan, maya is not a strict absolute idealism, but "a subjective misperception of the world as ultimately real."

Intuition and religious experience

"Intuition",  synonymously called "religious experience", has a central place in Radhakrishnan's philosophy as a source of knowledge which is not mediated by conscious thought. His specific interest in experience can be traced back to the works of William James (1842–1910), F. H. Bradley (1846–1924), Henri Bergson (1859–1941), and Friedrich von Hügel (1852–1925), and to Vivekananda (1863–1902), who had a strong influence on Sarvepalli's thought. According to Radhakrishnan, intuition is of a self-certifying character (svatassiddha), self-evidencing (svāsaṃvedya), and self-luminous (svayam-prakāsa). In his book An Idealist View of Life, he made a powerful case for the importance of intuitive thinking as opposed to purely intellectual forms of thought. According to Radhakrishnan, intuition plays a specific role in all kinds of experience.

Radhakrishnan discernes five sorts of experience:
 Cognitive Experience:
 Sense Experience
 Discursive Reasoning
 Intuitive Apprehension
 Psychic Experience
 Aesthetic Experience
 Ethical Experience
 Religious Experience

Classification of religions
For Radhakrishnan, theology and creeds are intellectual formulations, and symbols of religious experience or "religious intuitions". Radhakrishnan qualified the variety of religions hierarchically according to their apprehension of "religious experience", giving Advaita Vedanta the highest place:
 The worshippers of the Absolute
 The worshippers of the personal God
 The worshippers of the incarnations like Rama, Kṛiṣhṇa, Buddha
 Those who worship ancestors, deities and sages
 The worshippers of the petty forces and spirits

Radhakrishnan saw Hinduism as a scientific religion based on facts, apprehended via intuition or religious experience. According to Radhakrishnan, "if philosophy of religion is to become scientific, it must become empirical and found itself on religious experience". He saw this empiricism exemplified in the Vedas:

From his writings collected as The Hindu View of Life, Upton Lectures, Delivered at Manchester College, Oxford, 1926: "Hinduism insists on our working steadily upwards in improving our knowledge of God. The worshippers of the absolute are of the highest rank; second to them are the worshippers of the personal God; then come the worshippers of the incarnations of Rama, Krishna, Buddha; below them are those who worship deities, ancestors, and sages, and lowest of all are the worshippers of petty forces and spirits. The deities of some men are in water (i.e., bathing places), those of the most advanced are in the heavens, those of the children (in religion) are in the images of wood and stone, but the sage finds his God in his deeper self. The man of action finds his God in fire, the man of feeling in the heart, and the feeble minded in the idol, but the strong in spirit find God everywhere". The seers see the supreme in the self, and not the images."

To Radhakrishnan, Advaita Vedanta was the best representative of Hinduism, as being grounded in intuition, in contrast to the "intellectually mediated interpretations" of other religions. He objected against charges of "quietism" and "world denial", instead stressing the need and ethic of social service, giving a modern interpretation of classical terms as tat-tvam-asi. According to Radhakrishnan, Vedanta offers the most direct intuitive experience and inner realisation, which makes it the highest form of religion:

Radhakrishnan saw other religions, "including what Dr. S. Radhakrishnan understands as lower forms of Hinduism," as interpretations of Advaita Vedanta, thereby Hinduising all religions.

Although Radhakrishnan was well-acquainted with western culture and philosophy, he was also critical of them. He stated that Western philosophers, despite all claims to objectivity, were influenced by theological influences of their own culture.

Accusations of plagiarism 
Radhakrishnan's appointment, as a southerner, to "the most important chair of philosophy in India" in the north, was resented by a number of people from the Bengali intellectual elite, and The Modern Review, which was critical of the appointment of non-Bengalis, became the main vehicle of criticism. Soon after his arrival in Calcutta in 1921, Radhakrishnan's writings  were regularly criticised in The Modern Review. When Radhakrishnan published his Indian Philosophy in two volumes (1923 and 1927), The Modern Review questioned his use of sources, criticising the lack of references to Bengali scholars. Yet, in an editor's note, The Modern Review acknowledged that "As professor's Radhakrishnan's book has not been received for review in this Journal, The Modern Review is not in a position to form any opinion on it."

In the January 1929 issue of The Modern Review, the Bengali philosopher Jadunath Sinha made the claim that parts of his 1922 doctoral thesis, Indian Psychology of Perception, published in 1925, were copied by his teacher Radhakrishnan into the chapter on "The Yoga system of Patanjali" in his book Indian Philosophy II, published in 1927. Sinha and  Radhakrishnan exchanged several letters in the Modern Review, in which Sinha compared parts of his thesis with  Radhakrishnan's publication, presenting altogether 110 instances of "borrowings." Radhakrishnan felt compelled to respond, stating that Sinha and he had both used the same classical texts, his translation were standard translations, and that similarities in translations were therefore unavoidable. He further argued that he was lecturing on the subject before publishing his book, and that his book was ready for publication in 1924, before Sinha's thesis was published.

Scholars such as Kuppuswami Sastri, Ganganath Jha, and Nalini Ganguli confirmed that Radhakrishnan was distributing the notes in question since 1922. Ramananda Chatterjee, the editor of The Modern Review, refused to publish a letter by Nalini Ganguli confirming this fact, while continuing publishing Sinha's letters. The General Editor of Radhakrishnan's publisher, professor Muirhead, further confirmed that the publication was delayed for three years, due to his stay in the United States.

Responding to this "systematic effort [...] to destroy Radhakrishnan's reputation as a scholar and a public figure," Summer 1929 the dispute escalated into a juristic fight, with Radhakrishnan filing a suit for defamation of character against Sinha and Chatterjee, demanding Rs. 100,000 for the damage done, and Sinha filing a case against Radhakrishnan for copyright infringement, demanding Rs. 20,000. The suits were settled in May 1933, the terms of the settlement were not disclosed, and "all the allegations made in the pleadings and in the columns of the Modern Review were withdrawn."

Influence

Radhakrishnan was one of India's best and most influential twentieth-century scholars of comparative religion and philosophy.

Radhakrishnan's defence of the Hindu traditions has been highly influential, both in India and the western world. In India, Radhakrishnan's ideas contributed to the formation of India as a nation-state. Radhakrishnan's writings contributed to the hegemonic status of Vedanta as "the essential world view of Hinduism". In the western world, Radhakrishnan's interpretations of the Hindu tradition, and his emphasis on "spiritual experience", made Hinduism more readily accessible for a western audience, and contributed to the influence Hinduism has on modern spirituality:

Appraisal
Radhakrishnan has been highly appraised. According to Paul Artur Schillp:

And according to Hawley:

Criticism and context
Radhakrishnan's ideas have also received criticism and challenges, for their perennialist and universalist claims, and the use of an east–west dichotomy.

Perennialism

According to Radhakrishnan, there is not only an underlying "divine unity" from the seers of the Upanishads up to modern Hindus like Tagore and Gandhi, but also "an essential commonality between philosophical and religious traditions from widely disparate cultures." This is also a major theme in the works of Rene Guenon, the Theosophical Society, and the contemporary popularity of eastern religions in modern spirituality. Since the 1970s, the Perennialist position has been criticised for its essentialism. Social-constructionists give an alternative approach to religious experience, in which such "experiences" are seen as being determined and mediated by cultural determinants:

As Michaels notes:

Rinehart also points out that "perennialist claims notwithstanding, modern Hindu thought is a product of history", which "has been worked out and expressed in a variety of historical contexts over the preceding two hundreds years." This is also true for Radhakrishan, who was educated by missionaries and, like other neo-Vedantins used the prevalent western understanding of India and its culture to present an alternative to the western critique.

Universalism, communalism and Hindu nationalism
According to Richard King, the elevation of Vedanta as the essence of Hinduism, and Advaita Vedanta as the "paradigmatic example of the mystical nature of the Hindu religion" by colonial Indologists but also neo-Vedantins served well for the Hindu nationalists, who further popularised this notion of Advaita Vedanta as the pinnacle of Indian religions. It

This "opportunity" has been criticised. According to Sucheta Mazumdar and Vasant Kaiwar,

Rinehart also criticises the inclusivity of Radhakrishnan's approach, since it provides "a theological scheme for subsuming religious difference under the aegis of Vedantic truth." According to Rinehart, the consequence of this line of reasoning is communalism, the idea that "all people belonging to one religion have common economic, social and political interests and these interests are contrary to the interests of those belonging to another religion." Rinehart notes that Hindu religiosity plays an important role in the nationalist movement, and that "the neo-Hindu discourse is the unintended consequence of the initial moves made by thinkers like Rammohan Roy and Vivekananda." Yet Rinehart also points out that it is

Post-colonialism

Colonialism left deep traces in the hearts and minds of the Indian people, influencing the way they understood and represented themselves. The influences of "colonialist forms of knowledge" can also be found in the works of Radhakrishnan. According to Hawley, Radhakrishnan's division between East and West, the East being spiritual and mystical, and the West being rationalist and colonialist in its forms of knowledge constructed during the 18th and 19th centuries. Arguably, these characterizations are "imagined" in the sense that they reflect the philosophical and religious realities of neither "East' nor West."

Since the 1990s, the colonial influences on the 'construction' and 'representation' of Hinduism have been the topic of debate among scholars of Hinduism Western Indologists are trying to come to more neutral and better-informed representations of India and its culture, while Indian scholars are trying to establish forms of knowledge and understanding which are grounded in and informed by Indian traditions, instead of being dominated by western forms of knowledge and understanding.

Awards and honours

Civilian honours

National
:
 Recipient of the Bharat Ratna (1954)
:
 Knight Bachelor (1931), ceased to use the pre-nominal of Sir in 1947 following India's independence.

Foreign
:
 Recipient of the Pour le Mérite for Sciences and Arts (1954)
: 
 Sash First Class of the Order of the Aztec Eagle (1954)
:
 Honorary member of the Order of Merit (1963)

Other achievements
 A portrait of Radhakrishnan adorns the Chamber of the Rajya Sabha.
 1933–37: Nominated five times for the Nobel Prize in Literature.
 1938: elected Fellow of the British Academy.
 1947: election as Permanent Member of the Instutut international de philosophie.
 1961: the Peace Prize of the German Book Trade.
 1962: Institution of Teacher's Day in India, yearly celebrated at 5 September, Radhakrishnan's birthday, in honour of Radhakrishnan's belief that "teachers should be the best minds in the country".
 1968: Sahitya Akademi fellowship, The highest honour conferred by the Sahitya Akademi on a writer (he is the first person to get this award)
 1975: the Templeton Prize in 1975, a few months before his death, for advocating non-aggression and conveying "a universal reality of God that embraced love and wisdom for all people." He donated the entire amount of the Templeton Prize to Oxford University.
 1989: institution of the Radhakrishnan Scholarships by Oxford University in the memory of Radhakrishnan. The scholarships were later renamed the "Radhakrishnan Chevening Scholarships".
 He  was nominated sixteen times for the Nobel prize in literature, and eleven times for the Nobel Peace prize.

Commemorative stamps released by India Post (by year) -

In popular culture
Sarvepalli Radhakrishna (1988) is a documentary film about Radhakrishnan, directed by N. S. Thapa, produced by the Government of India's Films Division.

Quotes

 "It is not God that is worshipped but the authority that claims to speak in His name. Sin becomes disobedience to authority not violation of integrity."
 "Reading a book gives us the habit of solitary reflection and true enjoyment."
 "When we think we know, we cease to learn."
 "A literary genius, it is said, resembles all, though no one resembles him."
 "There is nothing wonderful in my saying that Jainism was in existence long before the Vedas were composed."
 "A life of joy and happiness is possible only on the basis of knowledge.
 "If he does not fight, it is not because he rejects all fighting as futile, but because he has finished his fights. He has overcome all dissensions between himself and the world and is now at rest... We shall have wars and soldiers so long as the brute in us is untamed."

Bibliography

Works by Radhakrishnan 
 The Philosophy of Rabindranath Tagore (1918), Macmillan, London, 294 pages
 
 Indian Philosophy (1923) Vol. 1, 738 pages. (1927) Vol. 2, 807 pages. Oxford: Oxford University Press (1st edition).
  The Hindu View of Life (1927), London: Allen & Unwin. 92 pages
 Indian Religious Thought (2016), Orient Paperbacks, 
 Religion, Science and Culture (2010), Orient Paperbacks, 
 An Idealist View of Life (1929), 351 pages
 Kalki, or the Future of Civilization (1929), 96 pages
 Gautama the Buddha (London: Milford, 1938); 1st India ed., 1945.
 Eastern Religions and Western Thought (1939), Oxford University Press, 396 pages
 Religion and Society (1947), George Allen and Unwin Ltd., London, 242 pages
 The Bhagavadgītā: with an introductory essay, Sanskrit text, English translation and notes (1948), 388 pages
 The Dhammapada (1950), 194 pages, Oxford University Press
 The Principal Upanishads (1953), 958 pages, HarperCollins Publishers Limited
 Recovery of Faith (1956), 205 pages
 A Source Book in Indian Philosophy (1957), 683 pages, Princeton University Press, with Charles A. Moore as co-editor.
 The Brahma Sutra: The Philosophy of Spiritual Life. London: George Allen & Unwin Ltd., 1959, 606 pages. 
 Religion, Science & Culture (1968), 121 pages

Biographies and monographs on Radhakrishnan 
Several books have been published on Radhakrishnan:

See also
 List of Indian writers
 Indian philosophy
 Vedanta Society
 Postcolonialism
 Sarvepalli Gopal

Citations

Notes

References

Sources

Printed sources

Online sources

External links

 Sarvepalli Radhakrishnan at the Internet Encyclopedia of Philosophy
   
 "Dr. Sarvepalli Radhakrishnan- The philosopher president", Press Information Bureau, Government of India
 "Sarvepalli Radhakrishnan (1888—1975)" by Michael Hawley, Internet Encyclopedia of Philosophy
 S. Radhakrishnan materials in the South Asian American Digital Archive (SAADA)

 

1888 births
1975 deaths
20th-century Indian philosophers
Advaitin philosophers
Madras Christian College alumni
Ambassadors of India to the Soviet Union
Fellows of All Souls College, Oxford
20th-century Hindu philosophers and theologians
Honorary members of the Order of Merit
20th-century Indian educational theorists
Indian Hindus
Indian Knights Bachelor
Telugu people
Neo-Advaita teachers
Knights Bachelor
Members of the Constituent Assembly of India
Presidents of India
Recipients of the Bharat Ratna
Recipients of the Pour le Mérite (civil class)
Templeton Prize laureates
Vice presidents of India
Vice Chancellors of Banaras Hindu University
University of Calcutta alumni
Academic staff of the University of Calcutta
Academic staff of the University of Mysore
Academic staff of Presidency College, Chennai
Academic staff of Maharaja's College, Mysore
Spalding Professors of Eastern Religion and Ethics
University of Madras alumni
People from Tiruvallur district
Vice-Chancellors of the Andhra University
Translators of the Bhagavad Gita
People from Cuddalore district
Honorary Fellows of the British Academy
Andhra movement